Sophia Marie Schubert (born January 31, 1996) is an American professional golfer.

Personal life
Began playing golf at four when her mom registered her and her sister for golf lessons. She majored in Sport management at the University of Texas. She searched for a new hobby to take her mind off golf. She found it in learning how to fly a plane, and takes lessons at the McGhee Tyson Airport, 20 minutes from her home in Oak Ridge. As of November 2022, she had been flying for five months and wants to get her pilot's license within the next year, but has not learned how to land. She had to put her lessons on hold for a month due to her playing schedule. She only flies in perfect weather as she is a beginner. After she gets her pilot's license, she then wants to get her own plane with the ultimate goal of flying herself to a tournament, like Arnold Palmer and Peggy Kirk Bell once did.

Amateur career
Schubert won the 2017 U.S. Women's Amateur, defeating the number-3 ranked amateur player in the world and former Olympian, Albane Valenzuela, in the final.

Schubert competed for the Texas Longhorns and became the first Longhorn to win the U.S. Women's Amateur since Kelli Kuehne in 1996. Schubert was caddied by her coach at Texas. She previously competed for the Christian Academy of Knoxville and competed at Auburn her freshman year in college before transferring to Texas.

Schubert turned professional in 2018 and made her pro debut at the 2018 Indy Women in Tech Championship on the LPGA Tour. She began playing on the Symetra Tour in 2019.

Schubert won her first professional event at the 2021 Carolina Golf Classic on the Symetra Tour.

Amateur wins
2012 AJGA Music City Junior Girls
2013 PNC Bank Junior Championship
2014 Under Armour - Scott Stallings Championship, The Alamo Invitational
2017 Lady Buckeye Invitational, U.S. Women's Amateur, Betsy Rawls Longhorn Invite

Source

Professional wins (1)

Symetra Tour wins (1)
2021 Carolina Golf Classic

Results in LPGA majors
Results not in chronological order before 2020.
 

CUT = missed the half-way cut
WD = withdrew
NT = no tournament
T = tied

Summary

LPGA Tour career summary

^ official as of 2022 season  
* Includes matchplay and other tournaments without a cut.

World ranking
Position in Women's World Golf Rankings at the end of each calendar year.

Team appearances
Amateur
Curtis Cup (representing the United States): 2018 (winners)
Arnold Palmer Cup (representing the United States): 2018 (winners)

References

External links

American female golfers
LPGA Tour golfers
Auburn Tigers women's golfers
Texas Longhorns women's golfers
Golfers from Knoxville, Tennessee
People from Oak Ridge, Tennessee
1996 births
Living people
20th-century American women
21st-century American women